Walbaum is a German surname. Notable people with the surname include:

Johann Julius Walbaum (1724–1799), German physician, naturalist and taxonomist
Johannes Walbaum (born 1987), German footballer
Justus Erich Walbaum (1768-1837), German type designer and punchcutter
Walbaum (typeface), the Didone typeface named after him.

German-language surnames